Sanford "Sandy" Jay Grossman (born July 21, 1953) is an American economist and hedge fund manager specializing in quantitative finance. Grossman’s research has spanned the analysis of information in securities markets, corporate structure, property rights, and optimal dynamic risk management.  He has published widely in leading economic and business journals, including American Economic Review, Journal of Econometrics, Econometrica, and Journal of Finance.  His research in macroeconomics, finance, and risk management has earned numerous awards. Grossman is currently Chairman and CEO of QFS Asset Management, an affiliate of which he founded in 1988. QFS Asset Management shut down its sole remaining hedge fund in January 2014.

Academic career
Sanford Grossman earned his A.B. in 1973, his A.M. in 1974 and Ph.D. in 1975, all in economics from the University of Chicago. Since receiving his doctorate, he has held academic appointments at Stanford University, the University of Chicago, Princeton University (as the John L. Weinberg Professor of Economics, 1985–89), and at the University of Pennsylvania’s Wharton School of Business. At Wharton, Grossman held the position of Steinberg Trustee Professor of Finance from 1989 to 1999 (a title now held in Emeritus) and also served as the Director of the Wharton Center for Quantitative Finance (1994–1999).

Professional career
Grossman served as an Economist with the Board of Governors of the Federal Reserve System (1977–78), and was a Public Director of the largest U.S. options and futures exchange, the Chicago Board of Trade (1992–96).  In 1988, he was elected a Director, in 1992 served as Vice President, and in 1994 was President of the American Finance Association.

Grossman formed an affiliate of QFS Asset Management, L.P. in 1988. The firm is based in Greenwich, Connecticut, and is an alternative investment management firm that uses financial investment models based on Grossman's research in economics and quantitative finance. The firm specializes in global macro and foreign exchange investment strategies.

Awards
Grossman’s original contributions to economic research received official recognition when he was awarded the John Bates Clark Medal by the American Economic Association at its December 1987 annual meeting.  That same year the Q-Group awarded him first prize in The Roger F. Murray Prize competition for the paper “An Analysis of the Implications for Stock and Future Price Volatility of Program Trading and Dynamic Hedging Strategies.”  The Editorial Board of the Financial Analysts Journal awarded him the 1988 Graham and Dodd Scroll for “Program Trading and Market Volatility: A Report on Interday Relationships.” Grossman received a Mathematical Finance 1993 Best Paper Award for his article “Optimal Investment Strategies for Controlling Drawdowns.”  Grossman received the 1996 Leo Melamed Prize by the University of Chicago Graduate School of Business for outstanding scholarship by a professor.  In 2002, Grossman was recognized by the University of Chicago with its Professional Achievement Citation.  Most recently, he was awarded the 2009 CME Group-MSRI Prize in Innovative Quantitative Applications.

Publications
Books:
 
Articles:

References

External links
 Profile at University of Pennsylvania's Wharton School of Business
 List of publications at University of Connecticut's Economics and Finance Research web site
 Interview with hedge fund newsletter
 List of publications at New School web site
 

1953 births
Living people
University of Chicago alumni
Financial economists
21st-century American economists
American hedge fund managers
University of Pennsylvania faculty
Fellows of the Econometric Society
Fellows of the American Academy of Arts and Sciences
20th-century American Jews
Presidents of the American Finance Association
21st-century American Jews